Kalanthia was a coastal town of ancient Cilicia, inhabited during the Roman and Byzantine eras. 

Its site is located near Erdemli in Asiatic Turkey.

References

Populated places in ancient Cilicia
Former populated places in Turkey
Roman towns and cities in Turkey
Populated places of the Byzantine Empire
History of Mersin Province